The 1991 Villanova Wildcats football team represented the Villanova University as a member of the Yankee Conference during the 1991 NCAA Division I-AA football season. Led by seventh-year head coach Andy Talley, the Wildcats played their home games at Villanova Stadium in Villanova, Pennsylvania. Villanova finished the season with an overall record of 10–2 and a conference mark of 7–1, sharing the Yankee Conference title with Delaware and New Hampshire. Villanova qualified for the NCAA Division I-AA Football Championship playoffs, losing to the eventual national champion, Youngstown State, in the first round.

Schedule

References

Villanova
Villanova Wildcats football seasons
Villanova Wildcats football